Bergvlei Pass is situated in the Mpumalanga province, on the R536 road between Sabie and Hazyview (South Africa).

References 

Mountain passes of Mpumalanga